

Kholokoe Tribe

Classification 
The Kholokoe Tribe refers to the Bakgatla Tribe of Morena Khetsi/Kgetsi son for Morena Tabane. The kholokoe tribe is found in the Eastern Free State (Harrismith, Wetsieshoek, Vrede, Kestel, etc.), Kwazulu/Natal(Nqutu), Mpumalanga (Daggakraal, Amersfoort), Heidelberg as their historical residence.  They are the offspring of Bakgatla Chief Tabane and Mathulare daughter of the Bafokeng Chief. Tabane fathered five sons, Diale, Kgetsi, Kgwadi (Motlôkwa), Matsibolo/Matsiboho, and Mosia (in order of their birth). Each broke away to form Bapedi, the kholokwe, Batlôkwa, Maphuthing and Basia respectively. The kholokoe tribe demonstrated linguistic and cultural characteristics that distinguished them from other Bantu-speakers of southern Africa, with their language showing a merger of South Sotho and Nguni languages. Other practices included totemism the kholokoe tribe totem is Phuthi - Duiker, some still hold on to the fowl, while others the porcupine), the preferential marriage of paternal cousins, and an architectural style characterized by a round hut with a conical thatch roof. The senior house of the Kholokoe tribe is the house of Moduli/Molupi son of Mokete, they are the Makholokoe a Letseba "letseba le letsebiloe ke mang, le Mokholoane a shoele a sa le tsebe". Tabane first son from his senior wife Matlaisane remained with the Bakgatla ba Motšha group, after Tabane concurred the Vha-Venda ation he married a Vha-Venda wife and fathered a son called Vele.

History (Nalane) 

The traditions of the Barolong kingdoms indicate that at some time in the past up until the leadership battles of the 14th Century they were all under the same rule of a line of kings who claimed descent from a common ancestor, Morolong. Following the death of Morolong's 4th generation great- grandson Masilo there was a leadership crisis that resulted in the formation of the Ba-Hurutshe and Ba-Kwena clans. the kholokoe tribe claim lineage from the Ba-Hurutshe clan and traced their early ancestry to Mokgatla, the founder of the BaKgatla and his 4th generation great grandson Tabane.

Around 1560 Kgetsi/Khetsi(Lekholokoe) son of Tabane married Mabale and fathered Moloi, Moloi married Maleseha and fathered Hlabathe, Hlabathe fathered Sehoala/Sehoele, Sehoala married Malekoesa and fathered Tjale, Tjale fathered Tsholedi, Tsholedi married Malekunya and fathered Motsoane, Motsoane fathered Mokholoane, fathered Matsemela who married Madiale and fathered the five known houses of Kholokoe Leubane, Maphale, Tsele, Motaoane and with Matsholedi fathered Lehasa.

Before the birth of Kgetsi/Khetsi, his father Tabane with other Bakgatla lived around "Thaba tsa Mohale" known today as Magaliesberg, during the 1600s Kgetsi/Khetsi took his group and moved eastwards and North of Lekoa (Vaal) settling near Seratoe today Standerton, at a mountain which since their occupation became Thaba Kholokoe.  This is where the kholokoe tribe lived for over 200 years, about eight to nine generations until the attacks of Matiwane in 1822, Mzilikazi in 1823 and is considered the birthplace of the kholokoe tribe. Some of the kholokoe tribe Kings/Chief that lived in Thaba Kholokoe:
- Kgetsi
- Moloi
- Hlabate
- Sehoaba/Sehoele
- Tyale
- Tsholedi
- Motsoane
- Mokholoane
- Matsemela
From Thaba Kholokoe they spread to many areas around the Free State and Natal. One group under the leadership of Morena Wetsi (Oetsi) went to Natal Nqutu and settled in today's Wetsieshoek, where many the kholokoes were killed inside a cave during a war against the Boers. The other group went with Tsuisi to Harrismith, another to Thaba-Kholo in Bethlehem, another group under Popo son of Wetsi (Oetsi) settled in Daggakraal while the other broke into a clan called Makgolokwe-a-Mafehleng under Sebobane son of Selotolotsa of Polane went to Heidelberg, then Limpopo and North West. The kingship/chieftaincy of the tribe has always been marked by disagreement and internal feuds, living the legacy for this leadership still in question to this day.

Although many consider the totem of the kholokoe tribe as a Phuthi (duiker), it is believed that this small antelope led Bakholokoe to safety during a war, there are some that say the Kholokoe tribe's totem is a porcupine Porcupine.

Land (Naha) 

Although one would love to hear the anecdotal side of the Kholokoe Tribe history, it is unfortunately heavily clouded by the ever-present and festering issue of land and property dispossession and subsequent brutal oppression and painful suffering of the Kholokoe Tribe, first from the Dutch ―Boer‖ Government (Volksraad) of the Free State, and subsequently from the British Orange River Colony Administration and even in the modern times, especially under the Bantustan (Native Homelands) system of the nineteen seventy's and the nineteen eighty's, during which period people like the late Qwaqwa Homeland Prime Minister T.K.Mopeli, ruthlessly sought to and nearly achieved destroying the Kholokoe Tribe! Much of the history written today states that Qwaqwa formerly known as Wetzieshoek was residence to only two Basotho tribes Bakoena and Batlokoa completely ignoring the presence of the Kholokoe tribe.

Like many other tribes, the kholokoe tribe was dispossessed of their land leading to their traditional leaders, the Batlokoa traditional leaders and the then secretary of the kholokoe traditional council  JT Gumede going to England in 1906 to protest the kholokoes and Batlokoa losing their ancestral land to the former Boer republics.

As early as 1837 the Kholokoe tribe was already resident in the northern Free State around the Maluti region, Northern Natal around the Klip River region and the Vaal River region, notably the areas of the Witsieshoek district and the Harrismith district. In 1856 the Kholokoe tribe, under Morena Wetsi, were forcefully dispossessed of this part of their territory by the Free State Dutch Government, on wholly unjustifiable pretenses, only two years after the Convention of Bloemfontein of 1854.

In 1866 Commandant C. de Villiers, also popularly known as Masoothonyane, who was then in charge of the Thaba Nchu, i.e. Harrismith district, and a member of the Volksraad, requested the tribes to assist the Free State Government in the war against Moshoeshoe. They rendered military service as the Free Burgher Natives, and their armed contingents were known as the ―Witlaps‖ and the ―Ringhals‖. The services were rendered firstly in consideration to secure and confirm the Tribes in free possession of the lands they then occupied, and secondly after successful conclusion of that war in 1868, for the payment of 9450 head of cattle to Commandant De Villiers acting for his Government, he agreed to the enlargement of the lands occupied by the Tribes. He, De Villiers actually promised them that the land, approximately 2130 square miles (551 667 hectares) - which the tribes were already occupying, would be secured for them. This is war talk, since in a way he was indirectly saying that this land that they were occupying could at any time be expropriated, if need be by forceful declaration and action, from them. This is still one of the case studies about land dispossession even today, as seen in the book called The land is ours

At least up to and according to the guarantees of the Proclamation of 1848, no land occupied by these Tribes had been encroached by any Europeans, so De Villiers appeared to be acting in good faith as based on that Proclamation. After the conclusion of the war in 1868, for the payment of 9450 cattle, it was agreed that all the land occupied mainly by two tribes, BaTlokoa and the Kholokoe, who assisted Commandant De Villiers and the Boers in the war against Moshoeshoe, would then be given to them, after it has also been enlarged. There were three payments which were made for the purchase of three different areas of the land: 2450 cattle paid for the Halspruit area, made by the BaTlokoa tribe, 4000 cattle paid for the Klip Rivier area, the land situated in the Vrede and Harrismith Districts, also made by the BaTlokoa tribe, and 3000 cattle paid for the Mill River Valley in the Harrismith district, made by the Kholokoe tribe. The payments for the land of the Ba-Tlokoa tribe were made by Morena Lesisa Tsotetsi, who was representing heirs of Morena Letika and Morena Lesala, both who were the late Marena (Chiefs) of the Ba-Tlokoa tribe. He paid the combined 7000 cattle for both the Halspruit and Klip Rivier areas, which were largely occupied by the Ba-Tlokoa tribe. The Halspruit area was home to the Ba-Tlokoa tribe under the late Morena Lesala, and the Klip Rivier area was under the late Morena Letika, both of whom were now represented by Morena Lesisa. The payment for the Mill River Valley land, which covered both Thabantsu and Witsieshoek districts of the Kholokoe Tribe was made by Morena Letlatsa Moloi, who was representing heirs of the Late Morena Hlomise, son of the late Morena Oetsi (―Witsie‖) of the Kholokoe Tribe. However, in 1888 the Kholokoe Tribe, after having received notice to leave the land, were forcibly evicted without any compensation. The struggle to regain their land had begun.

Chief Letlatsa Moloi of the Kholokoe Tribe became a thorn in the flesh for Captain John Quayle Dickson, the Advisor for Native Affairs in the British Colonial Orange Free State government. On the 5th of September 1903, Captain John Quayle Dickson wrote to Sir Harry Smith from his office in Bloemfontein indicating that he had visited Thabantsu (Harrismith) where he and the Regional Magistrate of the Thaba Nchu territory had personally met and informed Paramount Chief Letlasa of the Kholokoe Tribe that from then onwards he would be granted no special privileges whatsoever, and that he was now stripped of his position as one of the well-known and respected Morena oa Kholokoe, declaring him to be ―just another Native‖, and therefore from then in his opinion Paramount Chief Letlatsa will give no further trouble. Yet more trouble from the cheated and dispossessed tribes was coming! The boundaries of these areas were well defined as verified at the inquiry held in Harrismith by Captain John Quayle Dickson, Advisor for Native affairs, and Magistrate Leary, as reported in Captain Dickson's letter of 23 June 1906. A Mr. F Van Reenen also testified to the fact that Commander De Villiers had cheated these native Chiefs in dealing with them, and when this was brought to the knowledge of the Free State government, it forced his resignation from the Volksraad.

Battles fought by Ba/Ma-Kholokoe 

Some of the history states that Ba/Ma-Kholokoe were not great warriors but according to the battles fought, won and lost the Kholokoes were as good warriors as any other tribe that lived in that era. Many Battles were fought at Thaba Kholokoe, with Mzilikazi have attacked the Kholokoes a number of times.

In 1821 the battle between (Mahlapo) of Chief Mofeli and the Kholokoes under Chief Polane saw Polane and his Son Selotolotsa Killed, alongside many others and their cattle were taken.

In 1856/7 the battle of the Kholokoes under Chief Wetsi/Oetsi and the Boers saw many of the kholokoes killed in the cave while Wetsi (Oetsi) managed to escape to Lesotho.

Genealogical tree of the kholokoe tribe

Some of the notable kholokoe People 

 Dr Precious Moloi Motsepe - medical doctor, entrepreneur and wife of billionaire Patrice Motsepe
 Teboho Moloi - former soccer star
 Dr Matholela Lucas Moloi - Entrepreneur, media personality, and heir to the Makgolokwe a Mafehleng throne
 Pabi Moloi - media personality
 Timothy Moloi - singer
 Nchakha Moloi - entrepreneur
 Vusi Moloi - Author
 Godfrey Moloi - the founder of the taxi industry in South Africa, businessman and actor
 Lehasa Moloi - actor
 Lerato Moloi - media personality
 Artlehang Selepe Moloi - Visual Artist, Poet, Actor & Chef plus Entrepreneur, Great Grandson to KING (Morena Wetsi (Oetsi). Ba Leubane 
 Onicca Moloi - politician
 Nana Moloi actress played in the popular Impi intombi
 Thabo Moloi - soccer player
 Fanele Moloi
 Maitse Moloi
 Candy Moloi - Actor
 Dr Chomane Chomane - Former radio personality and businessman
 General Lambert Lehlohonolo Moloi - South African military commander, and a former commander of the African National Congress's military
 Phoka - Sotho musician
 Dr Tshepo Mvulane Moloi - Political analysts, academic
Bonginkosi Moloi-Paleontologist
 Kgaohelo Selepe Moloi (Mceekg) Actor,Print commercial Model, Entrepreneur - Great Grandson to KING (Morena Wetsi (Oetsi). Ba Leubane.
 Swata Zakariah Moloi his children { Mpine Maxwell Moloi and Mofaladi Cynthia Moloi}

References

Sources 

 DIE MAKHOLOKOE STAMHOOFDE, DIE GEKOSE STAMHOOF –
LETSITSA (II) – MOJALEFA OA BORENA BA MAKHOLOKOE‖, as
recorded in 1429 by the QWAQWA PRINTERS. This is translated as
―THE MAKHOLOKOE TRIBE KINGSHIP or CHIEFDOM, THE
PARAMOUNT CHIEF – LETSITSA (II) – THE KING OF THE KINGDOM
OF THE MAKHOLOKOE‖
 Ellenberger&and&J.C.&MacGregor,History of Basotu
 https://www.wdl.org/en/item/3269/view/1/66/
 https://munin.uit.no/bitstream/handle/10037/2073/thesis.pdf?sequence=1
 https://ir.uiowa.edu/cgi/viewcontent.cgi?article=4745&context=etd
 http://webcms.uct.ac.za/sites/default/files/image_tool/images/183/fhya_library/Ellenberger%2CF.%20History%20of%20the%20Basuto%2C%20Ancient%20and%20Modern%2C%201912_most_compressed..pdf
 https://archive.org/stream/historyofmatiwanmseb/historyofmatiwanmseb_djvu.txt
 http://heritagefreestate.co.za/files/dossier.pdf
 https://archive.org/details/basutotraditions00macg/page/38
 https://vdocuments.us/the-1907-deputation-of-basuto-chiefs-to-london-and-the-development-of-britishsouth.html
 https://repository.up.ac.za/handle/2263/63072/recent-submissions?offset=60
 https://www.tandfonline.com/doi/abs/10.1080/02561751.1931.9676266?journalCode=cast19
 https://books.google.co.za/books?id=q43sCQAAQBAJ&lpg=PA248&ots=vN9pJ9IZA-&dq=liale%20bapedi&pg=PA247#v=onepage&q=liale%20bapedi&f=false
 http://www.historicalpapers.wits.ac.za/inventories/inv_pdfo/A1655/A1655-Bk1-01-jpeg.pdf
 https://www.researchgate.net/publication/254919901_McTradition_in_the_New_South_Africa_Commodified_custom_and_rights_talk_with_the_Bafokeng_and_the_Bapedi/download
 https://books.google.co.za/books?id=1G43AAAAIAAJ&pg=PA77&dq=sons+of+molopi&hl=en&sa=X&ved=0ahUKEwj0sOWcn4LjAhWRDOwKHb1tCo0Q6AEILzAB#v=onepage&q=sons%20of%20molopi&f=false
 http://webcms.uct.ac.za/sites/default/files/image_tool/images/183/fhya_library/Ellenberger%2CF.%20History%20of%20the%20Basuto%2C%20Ancient%20and%20Modern%2C%201912_most_compressed..pdf
 https://books.google.co.za/books?id=RK-KAwAAQBAJ&pg=PA68&lpg=PA68&dq=bakgatla+tabane%27s+death&source=bl&ots=-OUCCDSNB1&sig=ACfU3U1T6_FaoZL2MVTS8ctrBWiz0N0iAw&hl=en&sa=X&ved=2ahUKEwj01pK8uorjAhXBsaQKHWxmAQw4ChDoATAGegQIBxAB#v=onepage&q=bakgatla%20tabane's%20death&f=false
 http://www.historicalpapers.wits.ac.za/inventories/inv_pdfo/A1655/A1655-Db9-01-jpeg.pdf
 https://books.google.co.za/books?id=HQxe3HcB9AAC&pg=PA183&lpg=PA183&dq=bakgatla+tabane%27s+death&source=bl&ots=OgEMpOUt8r&sig=ACfU3U2iT8oJiKR4Wkj6lWjMz-eX6XLYcA&hl=en&sa=X&ved=2ahUKEwjstsmqv4rjAhXxRBUIHUllAQU4ChDoATAIegQICRAB#v=onepage&q=bakgatla%20tabane's%20death&f=false
 http://www.nuleafsa.co.za/wp-content/uploads/2017/07/Appendix-G.2-Cultural-Heritage-Impact-Assessment.pdf
 https://vdocuments.us/the-1907-deputation-of-basuto-chiefs-to-london-and-the-development-of-britishsouth.html
 https://vdocuments.us/the-1907-deputation-of-basuto-chiefs-to-london-and-the-development-of-britishsouth.html
 https://books.google.co.za/books?id=q43sCQAAQBAJ&pg=PA255&lpg=PA255&dq=son+of+polane&source=bl&ots=vN9qQ3L-C_&sig=ACfU3U3nt_BSm839iQ2gtu0e7EJ1i-jXLA&hl=en&sa=X&ved=2ahUKEwjW8pyYtK_jAhVOfMAKHbOKABQQ6AEwCnoECAkQAQ#v=onepage&q=son%20of%20polane&f=false

Sotho-Tswana people